The 2019–20 Purdue Boilermakers men's basketball team represented Purdue University in the 2019–20 NCAA Division I men's basketball season. Their head coach was Matt Painter in his 15th season with the Boilers. The team played their home games at Mackey Arena in West Lafayette, Indiana as members of the Big Ten Conference. The Boilers finished the season 16–15, 9–11 in Big Ten play to finish in a tie for 10th place. Due to tie-breaking rules, they received the No. 10 seed in the Big Ten tournament before the tournament was canceled due to the coronavirus pandemic.

Previous season
The Boilermakers finished the 2018–19 season 26–10, 16–4 in Big Ten play to win a share of the Big Ten regular season championship, the school's conference-record 24th championship. As the No. 2 seed in the Big Ten tournament, they were upset by Minnesota in the quarterfinals. The received an at-large bid to the NCAA tournament as the No. 3 seed in the South region. They defeated Old Dominion in the First Round before beating defending champion Villanova to advance to the Sweet Sixteen. In the Sweet Sixteen, they defeated Tennessee in overtime to advance to the Elite Eight. There they lost to No. 1 seed Virginia in overtime.

Offseason

Coaching changes
In March 2019, assistant Greg Gary was hired as the new head coach at Mercer. As a result, Painter hired Micah Shrewsberry to return as associate head coach in May 2019.

Departures

Incoming transfers

2019 recruiting class

2020 recruiting class

Roster

Schedule and results

|-
!colspan=9 style=|Exhibition

|-
!colspan=9 style=|Regular season

|-
!colspan=9 style=|Big Ten tournament
|-
!colspan=9 style=|Canceled

Rankings

*AP does not release post-NCAA Tournament rankings^Coaches did not release a week 2 poll

References

Purdue Boilermakers men's basketball seasons
Purdue
Purdue
Purdue